The United Nations Educational, Scientific and Cultural Organization (UNESCO) World Heritage Sites are places of importance to cultural or natural heritage as described in the UNESCO World Heritage Convention, established in 1972. The Kingdom of Morocco accepted the convention on 28 October 1975, making its historical sites eligible for inclusion on the list. As of 2016, nine sites in Morocco are included, all selected for their cultural significance.

Morocco's first site, Medina of Fez, was inscribed on the list at the 5th Session of the World Heritage Committee, held in Paris, France in 1981. Two more sites were added in the 1980s, and another three in the 1990s, followed by two in the 2000s. The latest inscription, Rabat, Modern Capital and Historic City: a Shared Heritage, was added to the list in 2012.

In addition to its World Heritage inscriptions, Morocco also maintains thirteen properties on its tentative list.

World Heritage Sites
Site; named after the World Heritage Committee's official designation
Location; at city, regional, or provincial level and geocoordinates
Criteria; as defined by the World Heritage Committee
Area; in hectares and acres. If available, the size of the buffer zone has been noted as well. A lack of value implies that no data has been published by UNESCO
Year; during which the site was inscribed to the World Heritage List
Description; brief information about the site, including reasons for qualifying as an endangered site, if applicable

Tentative list
In addition to sites inscribed on the World Heritage List, member states can maintain a list of tentative sites that they may consider for nomination. Nominations for the World Heritage List are only accepted if the site was previously listed on the tentative list. As of 2016, Morocco lists thirteen properties on its tentative list:

See also
List of World Heritage Sites in the Arab states

References

 
Morocco
World Heritage Sites
World Heritage Sites